Trebija (in older sources also Terbija) is a settlement in the Municipality of Gorenja Vas–Poljane in the Upper Carniola region of Slovenia. It lies on the left bank of the upper course of the Poljane Sora River.

References

External links 

Trebija on Geopedia

Populated places in the Municipality of Gorenja vas-Poljane